Sandeep Kirtane (born 27 October 1973) is an Indian professional tennis player. He made his ATP Tour debut at the 1996 India Open, where he lost in the 1st round to Sandon Stolle.

References

External links

Indian male tennis players
Living people
1973 births
Racket sportspeople from Pune
Recipients of the Arjuna Award